Quentin Hughes may refer to:

 Quentin Hughes (architect) (1920–2004), British SAS officer, architect and academic
 Quentin Hughes (cricketer) (born 1974), English cricketer

See also
 Quintin Hughes